Every Day's a Holiday may refer to:

 Every Day's a Holiday (1937 film), an American film starring Mae West
 Every Day's a Holiday (1965 film), a British film starring Liz Fraser
 "Every Day's a Holiday" (song), a 1938 single by Glenn Miller and his Orchestra